Animax India is an Indian television channel owned by KC Global Media (formerly owned by Sony Pictures Networks India). At launch, It aired Hindi dub of anime, but then later would switch to English dubs and subbed anime, before the channel only focused on the latter. It was the only channel in India to simulcast anime on the same day as Japan.  

On 18 April 2017, Animax ceased broadcasting in India, with Sony Yay ultimately replacing the network. Sony would later make Animax’s Asian feed available on its Indian digital platform, Sony LIV, until 8 May 2020, when several Sony-owned networks were acquired by KC earlier that week.

On 20 January 2023, Animax resumed broadcasting in India exclusively via the streaming platform, JioTV.

History

Animax began operations across India and the rest of Indian subcontinent from 5 July 2004 with Irfan Pathan as a brand ambassador. It was operated and broadcast from Singapore by Animax Asia and distributed by Sony Pictures Networks India Pvt. Ltd. It was also the first animation channel that targets the age 15–25 demographic and was the only channel in India to simulcast anime in the same week and on the same day as Japan. Animax India started with 12 hours Hindi feed that targeted young kids and teens ages 7–14 and it had planned to launch Hindi and English language audio tracks.

From 15 August 2006, Animax entirely shut down its Hindi feed but kept its English one, since it changed its target audience to the ages 15–24 group.

In 2007, the network would begin airing live-action content like Tech Max, Game Max, Animax Press Play, Imagination and Speak Out and movies like Spider-Man 2, Kung Fu Hustle and Hellboy.

On 1 January 2008, Animax South Asia merged with Animax Asia's but had separate feed for india. Animax India rebranded its logo along with Singapore on 4 May 2010. Animax became the first channel to simulcast Tears to Tiara on April 6, 2009, Animax also aired Korean entertainment shows like Live Power Music, Pretty Boys & Girls and Comedy Boot Camp in Korean audio with English subtitles. Animax added American reality shows to their list with the premiere of Scare Tactics. Animax also simulcasted the yearly Video Game Awards hosted by Spike TV.

With the premiere of Nura: Rise of the Yokai Clan, Animax stopped dubbing anime and started airing them in Japanese audio with English subtitles instead. However, Animax continued to dub a few anime shows like the second season of The Melancholy of Haruhi Suzumiya. Animax continued to simulcast all the shows aired on AXN, its sister channel. The Shows Ghost Adventures, Chuck and Fear Itself were originally aired on AXN India. In 2012, the channel stopped airing such shows and reverted to its old logo, focusing only on anime. Moreover, all DTH providers in India delisted Animax as the channel couldn't pay carriage fees. Animax made its way back into the DTH networks in 2016 with its addition on Tata Sky at LCN 686. 

Animax ceased broadcasting in India on 18 April 2017, to which Sony would later provide the Asian feed, on its Indian digital platform, Sony LIV.

On 8 May 2020, the Asian feed would cease streaming on Sony LIV as a result of KC Global Media’s acquistion of serveral Asian Sony-owned networks .

Animax would resume broadcasting on the streaming platform JioTV on 20 January 2023. The network, as of 2023, currently is in a test phase, only airing Japanese-language anime.

Animax Kool Kidz

An Animax branded Hindi feed block "Animax Kool Kidz" was launched on Sony Entertainment Television from 5 December 2004. This block featured shows like Astro Boy, Cyborg 009, Daigunder, Fancy Lala, Princess Comet, Princess Sarah, Princess Tutu, Tales of Little Women and UFO Baby.

See also 
 Animax
 Animax Asia
 Animax Korea
 List of anime distributed in India

References

External links
  of Animax Asia

Television stations in Mumbai
Sony Pictures Television
Television channels and stations established in 2004
Television channels and stations disestablished in 2017
Television channels and stations established in 2023
2004 establishments in Maharashtra
Sony Pictures Networks India
Anime in India